Le Dernier des fous (also titled The Last of the Crazy People and Demented) is a 2006 French drama film directed by Laurent Achard. It won the Best Direction Award at the Locarno International Film Festival.

Cast
 Julien Cochelin as Martin
 Annie Cordy as Rose
 Pascal Cervo as Didier
 Dominique Reymond as Nadège
 Jean-Yves Chatelais as Jean
 Florence Giorgetti
 Thomas Laroppe as Raphael
 Nicolas Leclère as the Teacher

References

External links
 

2006 films
French drama films
2006 drama films
2000s French films